Ahmed Abdelkader (born 19 February 1999) is a French professional footballer who plays as a goalkeeper for Belouizdad.

Career

Abdelkader started his career with Guingamp II in 2018.

Career statistics

Club

References

1999 births
Living people
Sportspeople from Brest, France
French sportspeople of Algerian descent
French footballers
Algerian footballers
Association football goalkeepers
Championnat National 3 players
Algerian Ligue Professionnelle 1 players
En Avant Guingamp players
Sunderland A.F.C. players
English Football League players
French expatriate footballers
Algerian expatriate footballers
French expatriate sportspeople in Cyprus
Algerian expatriate sportspeople in Cyprus
Expatriate footballers in Cyprus
French expatriate sportspeople in England
Algerian expatriate sportspeople in England
Expatriate footballers in England
Footballers from Brittany